Westmoreland State Park lies within Westmoreland County, Virginia. The park extends about one and a half miles along the Potomac River and covers 1,321 acres. The Horsehead Cliffs provide visitors with a panoramic view of the Potomac River, and lower levels feature fossils and beach access. The park offers hiking, camping, cabins, fishing, boating and swimming, although mechanical issues have kept the swimming pool closed since 2021. Located on the Northern Neck Peninsula, the park is close to historical sites featuring earlier eras: George Washington's birthplace and Stratford Hall, the birthplace of Robert E. Lee.

History

Westmoreland State Park, the sixth of Virginia's six original state parks, opened in June 1936 after the Civilian Conservation Corps (CCC) constructed trails and amenities. Although some of the formerly unemployed workers were recruited in Virginia, most came from Pennsylvania and the Fort Dix, New Jersey recruiting office. Workers originally hand dug most of the roads and trails, and cabins were constructed from local timber and designed to reflect the area's pioneer heritage. Further land was acquired later in the century, and a gatehouse and swimming facilities built in the 1970s.

The Tayloe and Helen Murphy Hall is conference center recently renovated from a CCC-built restaurant dating from 1936. The facility features exposed wood beams, wrought iron hardware, and a large fireplace. The hall still includes a restaurant and now hosts meetings, special events, and educational programs. It is named for W. Tayloe Murphy Jr., former delegate to the Virginia legislature and Virginia Secretary of Natural Resources, and his wife, Helen, both of whom are from Westmoreland, Virginia.

Westmoreland State Park was listed on the National Register of Historic Places in 2005, as a national historic district based on its development of the state park system. The property includes 32 contributing buildings, 6 contributing sites, and 16 contributing structures.

Attractions

 Camping
 Cabins
 Hiking trails – 7 trails covering 6 miles
The park's popular "Beach Trail" leads from the Visitor Center to the shore of the Potomac, below the Horsehead Cliffs.  Embedded in these cliffs are fossil remains of porpoises, whales, and sharks from as long as 15 million years ago. Erosion over time exposes these remains and hunting for shark's teeth is a popular activity for visitors.
 Pool
 Beach area – on the Potomac River
 Fishing
 Boating – ramp available
 History and Nature Programs
 Gift Shop
 Visitor Center

Lodging

Westmoreland State Park has 26 cabins available for renting. These range from one-room efficiency log cabins to two-bedroom log or cinderblock cabins.

The park has 133 camping sites available for tents or recreational vehicles.

See also
 List of Virginia state parks
 List of Virginia state forests

References

External links

Official website Virginia Department of Conservation and Recreation
Westmoreland State Park on stateparks.com
Hiking Trails in Westmoreland State Park

Park buildings and structures on the National Register of Historic Places in Virginia
Historic districts on the National Register of Historic Places in Virginia
Buildings and structures in Westmoreland County, Virginia
National Register of Historic Places in Westmoreland County, Virginia
State parks of Virginia
Parks in Westmoreland County, Virginia
Civilian Conservation Corps in Virginia
Protected areas established in 1936
1936 establishments in Virginia
Beaches of Virginia